Dolphin's Barn is an inner city suburb of Dublin, Ireland, situated on the Southside of the city in the Dublin 8, and partially in the Dublin 12, postal district.

Etymology
The district's name possibly derives from an Anglo-Norman family named Dolphyn who owned a prominent storehouse there in medieval times. However it could also derive from its more ancient name of Carnán Cluana Úi Dhunchada (the little cairn of the meadow of the Úi Dhunchada) or its shortened version of Carn Úi Dhunchada (the cairn of the Úi Dhunchada), anglicised as "Dunphy's Cairn" and ending as "Dolphin's Barn".   The Úi Dhunchada were one of the three branches of the Úi Dúnlainge dynasty from which came most of the Kings of Leinster from the 5th to the 11th century AD.

Location and access
Surrounding areas include The Liberties, Inchicore, Islandbridge, Kilmainham and Crumlin.

Features
The Grand Canal passes through the centre of the locality under Dolphin's Barn Bridge.  The City Watercourse historically passed through the area too.

Sport
Dolphin's Barn is the home of Templeogue Synge Street GFC who own Dolphin Park in Dolphins Barn and who allow a local small Hurling Club use the ground called  Kevin's Hurling Club and former League of Ireland club Dolphins used to use the grounds many years ago.

The Dublin marathon passes down South Circular Road in Dolphin's Barn.

Amenities
Dolphin's Barn is home to one of the city's fire stations which is situated on the corner of Parnell Road and Rutland Avenue.

Jewish cemetery
The official Jewish cemetery of Dublin is on Aughavannagh Road near Dolphin's Barn. It was established in 1898 by Robert Bradlaw and the Dolphin's Barn Jewish Burial Society to replace the Ballybough Cemetery which was nearing capacity. Bradlaw was one of the founders of the St. Kevin's Parade Synagogue. The cemetery was dedicated to Sir Moses Montefiore.

Hospital
The Coombe Lying-In Hospital moved from the Liberties to modern buildings in Dolphin's Barn in 1967.  It was renamed the Coombe Women's Hospital in 1993 and again renamed as the Coombe Women & Infants University Hospital in January 2008.

See also
 List of towns and villages in Ireland.
https://www.logainm.ie/ga/57133

References

Towns and villages in Dublin (city)
Places in Dublin (city)
Jewish Irish history
Jews and Judaism in Dublin (city)
Uppercross